Museum of Fine Art may refer to:

United States
 Boston Museum of Fine Art, Boston, Massachusetts
 Brownsville Museum of Fine Art, Brownsville, Texas
 Dennos Museum Center, Traverse City, Michigan
 El Paso Museum of Fine Art, El Paso, Texas
 Jule Collins Smith Museum of Fine Art, Auburn, Alabama
 Kirkland Museum of Fine & Decorative Art, an art museum in Denver, Colorado
 Madison Museum of Fine Art, Madison, Georgia
 Museum of Fine Art, Houston, Texas
 Pennsylvania Academy of Fine Art, Philadelphia, Pennsylvania
 Southern Nevada Museum of Fine Art, Las Vegas, Nevada
 Zimmerli Museum of Fine Art, New Brunswick, New Jersey

Other countries
 Fine Art and Ceramic Museum, Jakarta, Indonesia
 Irbit State Museum of Fine Art, Russia
 Liechtenstein Museum of Fine Art, Vaduz, Liechtenstein
 Juan Carlos Castagnino Municipal Museum of Art, Mar del Plata, Argentina
 Montreal Museum of Fine Art, Montreal, Quebec, Canada
 Museum of Fine Art, Chandigarh, India
 Tigre Municipal Museum of Fine Art, Tigre, Argentia

See also
 
 
 Museum of Fine Arts (disambiguation)
 Art museum